Joseph Samuel Swift (born 25 May 1965) is an English garden designer, journalist and television presenter.

Television career
Swift is a regular presenter and designer on the BBC's Gardeners' World, co-presenter on the Royal Horticultural Society Chelsea Flower Show, Gardeners' World Live, Hampton Court, RHS Tatton Park Flower Show, BBC's Small Town Gardens, and design judge on BBC's Gardener of the Year. He has been a presenter/designer on Take 3 Gardeners (with Cleve West and Ann-Marie Powell).

He is a garden designer, and has been involved in BBC2's Gardeners' World since 1998. He is co-founder and Design Director of Modular Garden – a garden design and build company.

Swift has designed many gardens on TV, including one for Comic Relief, many for Gardeners' World, including the Bournville Garden, The 40-year garden, and for Alan Titchmarsh's How to be a Gardener series.

In 2009, Swift presented coverage of the Hampton Court Palace Flower Show for the BBC. He was also one of the main presenters of the BBC coverage of the 2010 Chelsea Flower Show. In 2013, he presented two episodes of Great British Garden Revival.

Writing
Swift has written for such newspapers as The Independent, The Evening Standard, and The Sunday Times, on the subject of landscaping and home gardening.

His writing also includes Gardeners' World Magazine, The Times, and various magazine and newspaper articles. He has written three books – The Plant Room, Joe's Urban Garden Handbook, and Joe’s Allotment, published in April 2009.

Personal life
Swift's father was the actor Clive Swift, and he was the nephew of David Swift. His mother is novelist Margaret Drabble, and his brother is academic Adam Swift. His sister Rebecca Swift (died April 2017) was a poet and founder of The Literary Consultancy. He is married with two teenage children.

He is the design director of Modular Garden.

Bibliography

References

External links

 
 Presenter biographies - Joe Swift BBC - Gardening

1965 births
Living people
British television presenters
Designers from London
English gardeners
English Jews
Joe